Chunni Lal Sahu (born 22 August 1968) is an Indian politician. He was elected to the Lok Sabha, lower house of the Parliament of India from Mahasamund, Chhattisgarh in the 2019 Indian general election as member of the Bharatiya Janata Party.

References

External links
Official biographical sketch in Parliament of India website

India MPs 2019–present
Lok Sabha members from Chhattisgarh
Living people
Bharatiya Janata Party politicians from Chhattisgarh
People from Mahasamund
1968 births